Catalanic may refer to:

 The Catalanic Community, also known as the Països Catalans (Catalan Countries)
 Judaeo-Catalan